Gareth Anscombe is a rugby union player who plays for the Wales national rugby union team. He primarily plays at fly-half but can also play as a fullback. Anscombe, who currently plays for the Ospreys in the United Rugby Championship, is the son of former Auckland and Ulster coach Mark Anscombe.

Early career

Anscombe debuted for Auckland in the 2010 season, in his first year out of school. In 2011, he was the top point scorer at the IRB Junior World Championship and retained his place in the Auckland squad.

Super Rugby

Anscombe made his debut for Auckland's Blues in 2012, coming on to replace Michael Hobbs in the round two match against the Chiefs in Hamilton. His starting debut was against the Bulls in round three, in which he scored all of the Blues points in a 29–23 win. Despite compelling form in the 2012 ITM Cup, where his pin-point accurate kicking helped Auckland to a finals appearance against eventual winners Canterbury, the Blues management seemed unmoved, and after John Kirwan took over the coaching of the Blues, Anscombe was delisted. It was announced that he would play for the Chiefs from the 2013 season. In 2013, he signed a contract extension with the Chiefs until 2014.

International career

New Zealand 

Anscombe represented New Zealand at under-20 level; he started at first-five when New Zealand won the competition now known as the World Rugby Under 20 Championship in 2011. However, he was not tied to New Zealand at senior level; only an appearance for the All Blacks themselves, or the country's official second-level side, the Junior All Blacks, would have tied him to that country.

Wales

In April 2014, a report in Cardiff's Western Mail indicated that Wales head coach Warren Gatland was seriously considering fast-tracking Anscombe into that country's international set-up, and that the Cardiff Blues of Pro12 were set to offer him a contract starting with the 2014–15 Northern Hemisphere season. Anscombe qualifies for Wales through his Cardiff-born mother.

On 20 January 2015, Anscombe was named in the 34-man Wales squad for the 2015 Six Nations Championship. He made his full international debut for Wales versus Ireland on 8 August 2015 as a second-half replacement.

On Saturday 16 March 2019, Anscombe was named Guinness Man of the Match having scored 20 points in Wales's 25-7 Grand Slam-winning victory over Ireland at the Principality Stadium.

References

External links
 
 Blues profile
 Auckland RFU profile

1991 births
New Zealand rugby union players
New Zealand people of Welsh descent
Wales international rugby union players
Blues (Super Rugby) players
Chiefs (rugby union) players
Auckland rugby union players
Cardiff Rugby players
Rugby union fly-halves
Rugby union fullbacks
People educated at Rosmini College
Rugby union players from Auckland
Living people
New Zealand expatriate sportspeople in Wales
Ospreys (rugby union) players
Expatriate rugby union players in Wales
New Zealand expatriate rugby union players
Citizens of the United Kingdom through descent
Welsh rugby union players